Lake Pass, elevation , is a mountain pass that crosses the Continental Divide in the Collegiate Peaks of the Rocky Mountains of Colorado in the United States.

See also

Southern Rocky Mountains
Sawatch Range
Collegiate Peaks
Colorado mountain passes

References

External links

Landforms of Chaffee County, Colorado
Landforms of Gunnison County, Colorado
Mountain passes of Colorado
Great Divide of North America